Phrynocrinidae is a family of echinoderms belonging to the order Millericrinida.

Genera:
 Phrynocrinus Clark, 1907
 Porphyrocrinus Gislén, 1925

References

Millericrinida
Echinoderm families